Solidarity for African Women's Rights (SOAWR) is a coalition of 63 civil society organisations working across 32 African countries to protect women's rights. Established in 2004, SOAWR works to protect the rights of girls and women as articulated in the Protocol to the African Charter on the Rights of Women in Africa (“The Maputo Protocol”).

The Coalition has five main aims:

 To contribute to the accelerated ratification of the Protocol in non-ratifying states.
 To support the implementation of the Protocol in ratifying states.
 To implement tracking and documentation mechanisms at the national and sub- regional levels.
 To strengthen national community mobilisation efforts to popularise and use the Protocol.
 To enhance conceptual clarity of coalition members around advocating for the Protocol.

Achievements 
The group has multiple achievements::

 Conducted an advocacy campaign that brought the Protocol into force 18 months after its adoption by AU Heads of State, the shortest interval for a human rights instrument to come into force in the AU.
 Used a mobile phone campaign ‘Text now 4 women’s rights’ to popularise the Protocol, enabling thousands of African phone users to join the campaign and be updated on ratification. It held press conferences, television and radio interviews and issued press releases.
 Enlisting 36 out of 54 AU state parties to support the Protocol, over 50% of eligible countries. 
 Publication of a Guide to Using the Protocol on the Rights of Women in Africa for legal action in four of the AU's official languages i.e. Arabic, English, French and Portuguese.
 Development and dissemination of the African Human Rights system first General Comments on Article 14 (1) (d) and (e), focusing on the rights of women living with HIV/AIDS.
 Convening over 150 lawyers from 32 African States since 2010, on the use of the Protocol in strategic litigation.
 Collaborating with the African Union Commission's Women Gender and Development Directorate and UN Women to pilot the adoption of a multi-sectoral approach by governments to fast track the implementation of the Protocol in 12 states.
 In collaboration with Equality Now, The African Commission on Human and Peoples’ Rights (ACHPR) and Make Every Woman Count produced Journey to Equality: 10 Years of the Protocol on the Rights of Women in Africa. The publication brings together contributions from over two dozen individuals and institutions writing on their areas of expertise and seeks to provide an evaluation of progress made in various countries and across the region in implementing particular provisions of the Protocol.
 Established working relations with the relevant AU departments to track the progress of ratification by member states.

Social media 
SOAWR maintains active Facebook and Twitter accounts and uses these to advocate for the remaining 13 African Member States to accede to the Protocol as well as for its full implementation.

References 

 Karoline Kemp, "The SOAWR campaign and ICTs", Pambazuka News, accessed 13 July 2009
 Norah Matovu Winyi, 'A call to action: Implement the Africa Women's Rights Protocol', Pambazuka News, accessed 13 July 2009
 Firoze Manji, Faiza Mohamed and Roselynn Musa, Breathing Life into the African Union Protocol on Women's Rights in Africa, Fahamu Books, accessed 13 July 2009, 
https://soawr.org/about-us/about-soawr/

International organizations based in Africa